The Islamic Center of Irvine (ICOI) is a mosque and Islamic community center founded by the local Muslim community in the city of Irvine, California on August 28, 2004. It is one of the largest Muslim congregations in California, with an estimated 2,500.0 worshipers attending weekly programs, and offers a variety of services from youth programs (including an annual summer camp for children) to senior workshops and interfaith sports activities. The Islamic Center of Irvine is partnered with the Islamic Society of Orange County in nearby Garden Grove, the Orange County Islamic Foundation in Mission Viejo, and the Islamic Institute of Orange County in Anaheim. The center has also teamed up with various churches and recently signed a friendship pact and held an event with Saddleback Church, one of the largest churches in the country.

Alleged FBI spying 

A convicted con man, Craig Monteilh of Tustin, accused the FBI of running him as a paid informant in the Center from July 2006 to October 2007, and then reneging on its deal with him. He was instructed to attend daily prayers at least three times a day and to attend the Friday Jumuah prayers. His actions made the members of the Muslim community very uncomfortable. 
A restraining order was later taken out against him.

Three members of the Center filed suit against the FBI and the United States in 2011 for violating several of their rights related to electronic surveillance during Monteilh's time as an informant. The case was initially dismissed by the United States District Court for the Central District of California in August 2012 after the FBI asserted state secrets privilege. The Ninth Circuit reversed this ruling in part, stating that under Foreign Intelligence Surveillance Act, the plaintiffs' had a right to seek legal action against the FBI which overrode their use of their state secrets privilege. The FBI appealed this ruling to the Supreme Court of the United States, which will hear the case during the 2021–22 term.

See also
  List of mosques in the Americas
  Lists of mosques 
  List of mosques in the United States

References

External links 

Mosques in California
Culture of Irvine, California
Religious buildings and structures in Orange County, California
Buildings and structures in Irvine, California
Mosques completed in 2004
Islamic organizations established in 2004
2004 establishments in California